Alex White (born November 4, 1981) is an American author of science fiction and horror. They are best known for The Salvagers trilogy and their tie-in novels for the Alien and Star Trek franchises. White uses singular they pronouns.

Biography 
White is autistic, bisexual, and queer and uses non-binary singular they pronouns. White was born in Mississippi and has lived in the American South for most of their life.

They live in Georgia, in the southern United States, with their spouse and son, working as an experience designer in addition to their writing career.

Career 
White is the author and composer for the audio fiction podcast The Gearheart, which ran for 5 years.

White's debut novel, the dystopian horror Every Mountain Made Low, was published by Solaris Books in 2016.

In 2018, White launched the space opera series The Salvagers at Orbit Books with the first volume, A Big Ship at the Edge of the Universe, and the second volume A Bad Deal for the Whole Galaxy following later the same year. The final volume of the trilogy, The Worst of All Possible Worlds (2021) was met with critical success, notably receiving a starred review and weekly pick status from Publishers Weekly.

White has written original tie-in novels for both the Alien and Star Trek franchises. Titan Books published White's Alien: The Cold Forge in 2018, and Alien: Into Charybdis in 2021, both of which were well-received by fans of the franchise. Their novel Star Trek: Deep Space Nine: Revenant was published by Pocket Books in 2021 and follows Jadzia Dax, and other characters from Star Trek: Deep Space Nine, through a tale built on a blend of science fiction and horror.

In 2022, Orbit Books published White's new space opera, August Kitko and the Mechas from Space, first in The Starmetal Symphony trilogy, to critical acclaim, earning a starred review from Publishers Weekly, which said it "expertly combines well-executed action with witty banter between charming characters". Emily Whitmore's review in Booklist said "White balances the elements of this space opera brilliantly...from the emotional connection between the characters to the huge plot pieces".

Bibliography

Novels 
Every Mountain Made Low (Solaris, 2016)

The Salvagers trilogy 
A Big Ship at the Edge of the Universe (Orbit, 2018)
A Bad Deal for the Whole Galaxy (Orbit, 2018)
The Worst of All Possible Worlds (Orbit, 2020)

The Starmetal Symphony trilogy 
August Kitko and the Mechas from Space (Orbit, 2022)

Tie-In Novels

Alien novels 
Alien: The Cold Forge (Titan, 2018)
Alien: Into Charybdis (Titan, 2021)

Star Trek novels 
Star Trek: Deep Space Nine: Revenant (Pocket Books, 2021)

Short fiction 
 "The Boy, the Bomb, and the Witch Who Returned", first published in Ministry Protocol: Thrilling Tales of the Ministry of Peculiar Occurrences, Imagine That! Studios, 2013

See also 
 List of science-fiction authors
 List of Star Trek novels: Deep Space Nine (1993-2021)
 List of Alien (franchise) novels

References

External links
 Official site
 Alex White at the Internet Speculative Fiction Database

Interviews 
 Interview: Author Alex White on ALIEN: THE COLD FORGE, Padraig Cotter, DreadCentral.com, 2018
 Alex White is Ready to Bring You Back to Deep Space Nine, Julian Gardner, StarTrek.com, 2021
 Exclusive Interview: “August Kitko And The Mechas From Space” Author Alex White, Paul Semel, paulsemel.com, 2022
 Q&A: Alex White, Author of 'August Kitko and the Mechas from Space', Elise Dumpleton, The Nerd Daily, 2022

Living people
21st-century American novelists
American science fiction writers
Queer writers
Novelists from Alabama
American LGBT novelists
LGBT people from Alabama
1981 births
21st-century American LGBT people
Bisexual non-binary people
People on the autism spectrum
Star Trek fiction writers
Science fiction writers
American non-binary writers
American bisexual writers